Tree-free paper or tree-free newsprint is described as an alternative to wood-pulp paper due to its raw material composition. It is claimed to be more eco-friendly considering the product's entire life cycle.

Sources of fiber for tree-free paper include:

 agricultural residues (e.g. sugarcane bagasse, husks and straw)
 fiber crops and wild plants, such as bamboo, kenaf, hemp, jute, and flax
 textiles and cordage wastes

Non-fibre sources include:

 calcium carbonate bound by a non-toxic high-density polyethylene resin

Paper manufacturing is a competitive industry with small operating profits therefore the raw materials used to make paper have to be very cost effective, using cheap, scalable renewable resources, coupled with relatively inexpensive ways to deliver large quantities to market. Until recently, commercial tree farming, has been shaped to account for these tight operating margins and supply cost limitations. Virtually all paper, however, requires massive cutting, replanting and re-cutting of wide swaths of forest. These limitations have made farm grown wood pulp the paper industry's overwhelming scalable raw material of choice.

The paper industry's answer to "tree free" paper has been focused on "recycled waste paper" as a tree-free alternative even though the vast majority of "recycled waste paper" originally started its life cycle from tree grown pulp.

Fiber dense agricultural residues have been known as a pulp substitute for years. Commercial low cost production technology coupled with limited resource abundancy plus low cost transportation to commercial business markets had created a barrier, virtually relegating true "tree free" paper from developing into anything more than small niche markets with even smaller niche market players. Furthermore, grasses and annual plants often have high silica contents. Silica is problematic as it consumes pulping chemicals and produces fly ash when burned.

See also
 Cotton paper
 Paper recycling
 Stone paper
 Wood-free paper

References

Paper
Waste minimisation
Deforestation